The Minnesota Golden Gophers women's ice hockey program represent the University of Minnesota during the 2017-18 NCAA Division I women's ice hockey season.

Following a Frozen Four appearance in March, the Golden Gophers were well represented in both international play and Olympic preparations.  The April IIHF World Championships featured an impressive 10 alumni and current players from the team.  Six players represented the US team including Lee Stecklein and 5 alumni. Of the two Canadians, current player Sarah Potomak made her country's team.  Two alumni represented Finland to round out the ten.  All of the Golden Gophers left the tournament with a medal, with the US taking gold, Canada silver, and Finland bronze.

In May, Countries began the 2018 Olympic selections.  The 2017-18 US Team includes six Minnesota alumni, and Lee Stecklein.  This will be Stecklein's second Olympic Games. A week after the US announced their team, Team Canada completed their Centralization roster, choosing Sarah Potomak, and her sister Amy Potomak.  Of the 28 selected, 23 will be chosen to represent Canada at the Olympics

Recruiting

Roster

2017–18 Golden Gophers

Standings

2017-18 Schedule

|-
!colspan=12 style="background:#AF1E2D;color:#FFC61E;"| Regular Season

|-
!colspan=12 style="background:#AF1E2D;color:#FFC61E;"| WCHA Tournament

Awards and honors

References

Minnesota
Minnesota Golden Gophers women's ice hockey seasons
Minnesota
Minne
Minne